William Worsley may refer to:

 Sir William Worsley, 4th Baronet (1890–1973), English landowner and amateur first-class cricketer, father of Katharine, Duchess of Kent
 Sir William Worsley, 6th Baronet (born 1956), British forester, farmer and businessman, grandson of the 4th Baronet

See also
 Willie Worsley (born 1945), American professional basketball player